Filípe Miguel Maganinho dos Santos Gonçalves (born 12 August 1984) is a Portuguese professional footballer who plays for Lusitânia F.C. as a midfielder.

He made 154 Primeira Liga appearances, for Braga, Vitória Setúbal, Paços Ferreira, Moreirense, Estoril and C.D. Nacional, as well as 206 games in the second tier for four clubs. Abroad, he had a brief spell with Śląsk Wrocław in Poland's Ekstraklasa.

Club career
Born in Espinho, Gonçalves spent the vast majority of his first four years as a senior in the third division, representing S.C. Espinho and S.C. Braga's reserves. Whilst at the service of the latter he made his debut in the Primeira Liga with the first team, playing 11 minutes in a 2–1 away win against Boavista F.C. on 7 May 2005.

Gonçalves alternated between the second and first tiers in the following years, appearing for Leixões SC, Vitória FC, C.D. Trofense and Moreirense FC. In the 2007–08 season, he contributed 34 official matches for the Setúbal-based club, including six and one goal in the victorious run in the domestic League Cup.

On 27 May 2013, Gonçalves signed for G.D. Estoril Praia for two years. He made his competitive debut for them on 1 August, starting and playing 85 minutes in a 0–0 home draw against Hapoel Ramat Gan Givatayim F.C. in the third qualifying round of the UEFA Europa League.

After one season back at Moreirense, Gonçalves moved abroad for the first time, joining compatriot Alvarinho at Śląsk Wrocław in Poland. He scored in one of his first Ekstraklasa games, a 2–0 victory at Pogoń Szczecin on 1 August 2016.

In January 2017, Gonçalves rescinded his contract in Eastern Europe and returned to his country's top flight, on an 18-month deal at C.D. Nacional. Six months later, he dropped down a tier to sign for newly promoted U.D. Oliveirense for two years.

Gonçalves renewed with the team from Oliveira de Azeméis for one more year in June 2019, and he carried on playing until his release in 2021, just after relegation to the new Liga 3. In July, he and Ricardo Tavares moved to Lusitânia F.C. in the same league.

Club statistics

Honours
Espinho
Segunda Divisão: 2003–04

Leixões
Segunda Liga: 2006–07

Setúbal
Taça da Liga: 2007–08

References

External links

1984 births
Living people
People from Espinho, Portugal
Sportspeople from Aveiro District
Portuguese footballers
Association football midfielders
Primeira Liga players
Liga Portugal 2 players
Segunda Divisão players
S.C. Espinho players
S.C. Braga B players
S.C. Braga players
Leixões S.C. players
Vitória F.C. players
F.C. Paços de Ferreira players
C.D. Trofense players
Moreirense F.C. players
G.D. Estoril Praia players
C.D. Nacional players
U.D. Oliveirense players
Lusitânia F.C. players
Ekstraklasa players
Śląsk Wrocław players
Portugal youth international footballers
Portuguese expatriate footballers
Expatriate footballers in Poland
Portuguese expatriate sportspeople in Poland